Dragan Stevanović (born 16 August 1971) is a Serbian football manager and former player.

Career
Stevanović played for Rad in the First League of FR Yugoslavia, before moving abroad to German club VfL Wolfsburg in 1997. He also played for FC St. Pauli, before returning to Rad in 1999. Subsequently, Stevanović moved to Red Star Belgrade, helping them win the championship in 2000.

After hanging up his boots, Stevanović served as manager of several clubs in his homeland, including Rakovica and Omladinac Novi Banovci. He was also manager of Rad during the 2018–19 Serbian SuperLiga.

References

External links
 
 
 

1971 births
Living people
Footballers from Belgrade
Yugoslav footballers
Serbia and Montenegro footballers
Serbian footballers
Association football forwards
FK Voždovac players
FK Rad players
VfL Wolfsburg players
FC St. Pauli players
Red Star Belgrade footballers
Apollon Smyrnis F.C. players
FK Radnički Obrenovac players
First League of Serbia and Montenegro players
Bundesliga players
2. Bundesliga players
Serbia and Montenegro expatriate footballers
Serbia and Montenegro expatriate sportspeople in Germany
Expatriate footballers in Germany
Serbia and Montenegro expatriate sportspeople in Greece
Expatriate footballers in Greece
Serbian football managers
FK Rad managers
FK Smederevo managers
Serbian SuperLiga managers